Carlos Arberto Espínola Oviedo (born 25 December 1975, in Yaguarón) is a retired Paraguayan football defender.

Espínola began his professional career at Paraguayan club Cerro Porteño for three years, winning a national title with them in 1996. He had a brief spell at Mexican powerhouse América in 1999, but returned to Cerro Porteño the next year where he won another national title. Over the next two years, Espínola played for Paraguayan Primera División clubs Libertad and Sport Colombia.

In 2003, Espínola went to Ecuador to play for LDU Quito, where he had considerable success winning a national championship in 2003 and in 2005. In the last game of the 2006 season, Espínola was involved in a melee during a match against Barcelona. During the melee, Espínola kicked Leonardo Soledispa in the face. He received a one-year suspension for his actions.

He returned in 2008 after completing his suspension to play for Deportivo Cali in Colombia and Emelec in Ecuador. In 2009, he returned to LDU Quito where he was an integral member of the squad that won the 2009 Recopa Sudamericana and 2009 Copa Sudamericana.

He played for the Paraguay national team between 2000 and 2004.

Honors
Cerro Porteño
Primera División: 1996, 2001

LDU Quito
Serie A: 2003, 2005 Apertura, 2010
Copa Sudamericana: 2009
Recopa Sudamericana: 2009, 2010

References

External links
 
 

1975 births
Living people
Paraguayan footballers
Paraguay international footballers
Paraguayan Primera División players
Categoría Primera A players
Ecuadorian Serie A players
Liga MX players
Peruvian Primera División players
Cerro Porteño players
Club América footballers
Club Libertad footballers
Sport Colombia footballers
L.D.U. Quito footballers
Deportivo Cali footballers
C.S. Emelec footballers
Sporting Cristal footballers
Paraguayan expatriate footballers
Expatriate footballers in Colombia
Expatriate footballers in Ecuador
Expatriate footballers in Mexico
Expatriate footballers in Peru
Paraguayan emigrants to Ecuador
Association football defenders